Stöllet is a locality situated in Torsby Municipality, Värmland County, Sweden with 245 inhabitants in 2010.

References 

Populated places in Torsby Municipality
Värmland